Murray Turnbull (1919–2014) was an American artist and art educator, but is best known as the founder of the East–West Center in Honolulu. He was born in Sibley, Iowa. He received a BFA from the University of Nebraska in 1941 and an MA from the University of Denver in 1949. In 1954, he began teaching at the University of Hawaii In 1959, while acting dean of the university's College of Arts and Sciences, Turnbull first proposed an "international college" for all the peoples of Asia and the Pacific. The idea was advanced by Hawaii's delegate to the U.S. House of Representatives (and later governor) John A. Burns, who, with the help of Senate Majority Leader Lyndon B. Johnson, obtained federal funding for an international university in Hawaii, now known as the East–West Center. Turnbull retired from the University of Hawaii as a professor emeritus in 1985.

Although a modernist, Turnbull is known for his brightly colored figurative paintings.  It Looked as if a Night of Dark Intent was Coming from 1992, is an example of the artist's distinctly modern approach to figurative art. In addition to paintings, Turnbull designed the following public art:
 Four-story stained glass windows for Keller Hall at the University of Hawaii at Manoa, 1958
 Four concrete sculpture walls for the Music Building at the University of Hawaii at Manoa, 1975
 A forty-foot mural for Wahiawa Intermediate School, 1975
 A fifty-foot mural on the exterior wall of Kokua Market in Moiliili, Hawaii, 2001

References
 Haar, Francis and Murray Turnbull (ed.), Artists of Hawaii: Volume Two, University of Hawaii Press, Honolulu, 1977, 
 Hartwell, Patricia L. (editor), Retrospective 1967-1987, Hawaii State Foundation on Culture and the Arts, Honolulu, Hawaii, 1987, p. 14
 Wisnosky, John and Tom Klobe, A Tradition of Excellence, University of Hawai'i, Honolulu, 2002, p. 114

Footnotes

University of Hawaiʻi faculty
1919 births
Painters from Hawaii
20th-century American painters
2014 deaths
21st-century American painters